Mary G. Croarken is a British independent scholar and author in the history of mathematics and the history of computing.

Education and career
Croarken earned a degree in computer science from the University of Warwick in 1982 and a doctorate in the history of science there in 1986, supervised by Martin Campbell-Kelly, who describes her as one of his two most successful students.

After leaving academia to raise a family in Norwich, she became a health research manager in the National Health Service, while continuing to work in the history of science as an independent scholar. She has been a research fellow at the National Maritime Museum in Greenwich and in the computer science department at the University of Warwick.

Books
Croarken is the author of the book Early Scientific Computing in Britain (Clarendon Press, 1990). She is a co-editor of The History of Mathematical Tables: from Sumer to Spreadsheets (Oxford University Press, 2003) and of Mathematics at the Meridian: The History of Mathematics at Greenwich (Chapman & Hall / CRC, 2020)

References

Year of birth missing (living people)
Living people
British historians of mathematics
British women historians
Alumni of the University of Warwick